"House on Old Lonesome Road" is a song written by Dave Gibson and Bernie Nelson, and recorded by American country music artist Conway Twitty.  It was released in August 1989 as the second single and title track from the album House on Old Lonesome Road.  The song reached No. 19 on the Billboard Hot Country Singles & Tracks chart.

Chart performance

References

1989 singles
Conway Twitty songs
Song recordings produced by Jimmy Bowen
MCA Records singles
Songs written by Dave Gibson (American songwriter)
1989 songs